Otonoma leucochlaena is a moth in the family Cosmopterigidae. It was described by Edward Meyrick in 1919. It is found in Australia, where it has been recorded from Queensland.

References

Cosmopteriginae
Moths described in 1919